Smørøyet was a Norwegian children and young people's TV series which ran on NRK1 from winter 1998 to spring 2000. The programme consisted of series, live artists, linked themes and presenters. The series followed on the children and young people's series Midt i smørøyet which finished in spring 1998. Smørøyet was followed by the series Reser in autumn 2000.

The series premiered on NRK on 22 September 1998. The last episode was shown on 1 April 2000. The series won an award for best magazine programme at the Gullruten 1999.

Presenters
Petter Schjerven (Presenter) (1998–99)
Ole Martin Lauritsen (Presenter) (1998–99)
Janne Rønningen (Reporter/presenter) (1998–00)
Anja Stabell (Reporter) (1998–00)
Stian Barsnes-Simonsen (1999–00)
Anders Varmann Hustad (1999–00)

Producers
Hans-Olav Thyvold (1998–99)
Barbro Semmingsen (1999–00)

Directors
Mette Kristensen
Hilde Hægh

Series shown on the programme
Egil & Barbara (1998–99)
Operasjon Popcorn (1998)
Latex (1998–99) (with Erlend Loe)
Sølvsjalet (1998)
Asylet (1999)
Janne flytter hjemmefra (1999)
I søsterens verden (1999–00) (director: Stine Buer)
Ansur (1999) was shown in winter 1999 under the title "Smørøyet presenterer ANSUR" (no other series had this type of title) (7 episodes)

References

External links

Norwegian children's television series
NRK original programming
1990s Norwegian television series
2000s Norwegian television series
1998 establishments in Norway
2000 disestablishments in Norway